Peter May may refer to:

Peter W. May, American businessman
Peter May (cricketer) (1929–1994), English Test cricketer
Peter May (writer) (born 1951), Scottish television screenwriter, novelist and crime writer
Peter May (weightlifter) (born 1966), British weightlifter
J. Peter May (born 1939), mathematician